Mark or Marc Stein may refer to:
 Sir Marc Aurel Stein (1862–1943), Hungarian-British archaeologist
 Mark Stein (musician) (born 1947), American musician
 Mark Stein (author) (born 1951), American screenwriter, playwright, and non-fiction writer
 Mark Stein (footballer) (born 1966), English footballer
 Mark Stein (American football), American football coach
 Marc Stein (footballer) (born 1985), German footballer
 Marc Stein (reporter), American sports reporter

See also
 Aaron Marc Stein (1906–1985), American novelist who wrote as George Bagby
 Mark Steyn (born 1959), Canadian author and political commentator